Persististrombus nodosus  is an extinct species of fossil sea snail, a marine gastropod mollusk in the family Strombidae, the conchs.

Description
Persististrombus nodosus is quite polymorphic, but it is usually slender with high spire. Spire whorls show strong nodes or spines. The sutural ramp and the last whorl bear spiral ribs, quite variable in number and strength. The surface of the last whorl is crumpled., with a slightly concave area.

Fossil record
Fossils of Persististrombus nodosus are found in marine strata of the Miocene (age range: from 20.43 to 7.246  million years ago.).  Fossils are known from Austria, France, Greece, Italy, Poland and Turkey.

References

Strombidae